Wu Ching-hsien is a Taiwanese singer and actress.

Wu's singing career began in the 1960s. She won the Golden Bell Award for Best Actress in 1984, appearing as the mother in the series Star Knows My Heart.

References

1948 births
Living people
Actresses from Anhui
Taiwanese people from Anhui
20th-century Taiwanese women singers
20th-century Taiwanese actresses
Taiwanese television actresses
Singers from Anhui
People from Hefei
21st-century Taiwanese actresses
21st-century Taiwanese women singers